A splitboard is a snowboard that can be separated into two ski-like parts used with climbing skins to ascend slopes the same way alpine touring or telemark skis are. The main difference is that a splitboard will have an additional metal edge (down the center of the board) for extra grip in ski mode. Unlike normal snowboards, it will also have nose and tail clips, split hooks, and touring mounts. Similar to cross country skiing, splitboarding allows free heel movement and with skins attached to the bottom of the skis, provides uphill traction. The two halves can then be connected to form a regular snowboard for descent. Splitboarding culture often focuses on the idea of using your own power to access the backcountry usually on unmaintained trails.

When snowboarding originated in 1965, it was prohibited in resorts across America until the 1984-85 snowboard season. By the early 1990s, majority of resorts across the US opened their doors to snowboarders and in less than five years later splitboarding emerged. The development of splitboarding simplified backcountry snowboarding, making pristine powder beyond the lift lines accessible to winter recreation enthusiasts.

In April 1990, an article of a patent of a split board made by Nicolò Manaresi from Bologna was published in an Italian magazine SKATESNOWBOARD, a photo of a Sims board split in two appears (source Erik Pernisco). 
A first splitboard set-up was shown on that magazine, for which the patent application was filed on 7 March 1990.
 
Thanks to a research by Ettore Personnettaz it was possible to contact the inventor and the original documents were found, in the following link it is possible to view original images of the patent:
https://www.freeridealliance.com/2020/10/29/history-of-the-splitboard/

In 1991, Brett "Kowboy" Kobernik brought a crude prototype of the first splitboard to Mark "Wally" Wariakois, the founder of Voile. At the time Wally was intensely focused on innovating new backcountry ski and telemark binding designs, but he saw the future of backcountry snowboarding in Kowboy's crude design. Over the next few years, Kowboy and Wally refined this idea and in 1994 released the first DIY Voile Split Kit. This was the beginning of the splitboard revolution. For the first time riders had a truly innovative and easier way to access backcountry powder. Surveys from SIA showed an increase in the number of skiers and snowboarders using non-resort backcountry terrain from 1.8 million to 2.2 million in a four-year time period. That number significally increased as well from 4.3 million to 6.3 million when resort backcountry terrain was included. The popularity of splitboarding in the last decade has prompted many outfitters to offer half day, full day or even multi-day excursions across the globe.

In the last decade there has been an emergence of splitboarding companies. Such as Karakoram splitboard bindings, Spark R and D bindings, Jones Snowboards. These three companies have revolutionized the sport and created an affordable splitboarding market which has helped increase participation in the sport. Before 2006, Voile was the leading splitboarding company which sold the early track system binding that was a precursor to the modern style split specific binding and puck systems. Since 2006 much lighter weight metals and plastics have been introduced into the binding systems creating a more responsive and durable split board binding. Also, there are a wide variety of splitboards to choose from on the market then previous years. Companies like Jones Snowboards have developed splitboard lines into their brand which are high performing and relatively affordable. Splitboards can come in hybrid camber styles, full camber styles, volume shifted shapes, powder shapes, and also are designed for women and children.

References

External links
Freeride Alliance
Where is Kyle Miller
Splitboard Education & Community
DIY Kits & Boards
 
splitboard.com
SplitboardReviews.com
splitboarding.eu / German and English
Team SPLIT Splitboard Tirol - Splitboard and Freeride Community
http://www.splitfest.nl / dutch community
https://www.mendiboard.com/ spanish community

Sports equipment
Snowboarding